Smyrna Heights is a neighborhood of Smyrna, Georgia, United States, built in the 1950s.

Education
 Cobb County Public Schools

Parks
 Tolleson Park
 Askew Park
 Brinkley Park

References

Neighborhoods in Georgia (U.S. state)